Intruder may refer to:

Film and television 
 The Intruder (1914 film), directed by Wallace Reid
 The Intruder (1933 film), an American film by Albert Ray
 The Intruder (1939 film), La intrusa, an Argentine film by Julio Saraceni
 The Intruder (1944 film), a 1944 Mexican film starring Carlos Orellana
 The Intruder (1953 film), a British post-war drama by Guy Hamilton
 The Intruder (1956 film), an Italian melodrama by Raffaello Matarazzo
 The Intruder (1962 film), an American racial segregation drama by Roger Corman
 The Intruder (1975 film), an American horror film
 The Intruder (1986 film), Pembalasan Rambu, an Indonesian action film by Jopi Burnama
 Intruder (1989 film), an American horror film by Scott Spiegel
 Intruder (1993 film), Intruso, a Spanish psychological thriller by Vicente Aranda
 The Intruder (1994 film), an Australian psychological drama by Richard Wolstencroft
 Intruder (1997 film), Hung bou gai, a Hong Kong horror thriller by Tsang Kan-cheung
 The Intruder (1999 film), a Canadian-British psychological thriller by David Bailey
 The Intruder (2004 film), L'intrus a French drama by Claire Denis
 The Intruder (2010 film), Khiao A-khat, a Thai horror film by Thanadol Nualsuth
 Intruder (2016 film), an American horror film by Travis Zariwny
 The Intruder (2017 film), a 2017 Italian drama film
 The Intruder (2019 film), an American psychological thriller film
 Intruder (2020 film), a South Korean mystery thriller film
 The Intruder (2020 film), an Argentine thriller film
 "The Intruder" (Captain Power and the Soldiers of the Future), an episode of Captain Power and the Soldiers of the Future
 "The Intruder" (The Owl House), an episode of The Owl House
 "The Intruder" (Stargate Atlantis), an episode of US TV series Stargate Atlantis
 Intruder (TV series), a 2021 British miniseries
 The Intruder (TV series), an eight-part British children's drama series from 1972

Literature 
 Intruder, a 1990 science fiction novel by Robert Thurston in the Isaac Asimov's Robots and Aliens series
 Intruder (novel), a 2012 novel set in C. J. Cherryh's Foreigner universe
 The Intruder (D'Annunzio novel), an 1892 novel by Gabriele D'Annunzio
 The Intruder (Townsend novel), a 1969 children's novel by John Rowe Townsend
 The Intruder: A Novel of Boston a 1981 novel by Anton Myrer
 Intruder (play), an 1891 play by Belgian playwright Maurice Maeterlinck

Military and technology 
 Intruder (air combat), an air combat mission in which fighter aircraft penetrate enemy airspace at night in order to interdict enemy air operations by ambushing enemy aircraft
 Intruder (satellite), a spy satellite system by the US National Reconnaissance Office
 Grumman A-6 Intruder, an American military aircraft
 Suzuki Intruder, a cruiser-type motorcycle
 Operation Whitebait, a notable WWII example of intruder operations

Music
 Intruder (Serbian band), a Serbian electronica/pop band
 Intruder (American band), a 1980s American thrash metal band
 "Intruder" (song), a 1980 song by the British singer Peter Gabriel
 "Intruder" (Gary Numan album), a 2021 album by Gary Numan
 "Intruder", an instrumental by Van Halen from the 1982 album Diver Down

Other uses
 Intruder (board game), a 1980 solitaire science fiction game
 Trespasser
 "The Intruder", a nickname used by Jesse Hernandez

See also
 
 Intruders (disambiguation)
 Intrusion, a geological rock formation
 Intrusion (disambiguation)
 Intruso (disambiguation)
 La Intrusa (disambiguation)